Liana Grigoryan (born 13 June 1986) is an Armenian football referee and a former footballer who played as a midfielder. She has been a member of the Armenia women's national team.

See also
List of Armenia women's international footballers

References

1986 births
Living people
Women's association football midfielders
Armenian women's footballers
Armenia women's international footballers
Women association football referees
Women's association football referees